The Poland national rugby league team (Polska XIII) represent Poland in international rugby league football competitions throughout Europe and around the World. Polska XIII competed in the 2018 Emerging Nations World Championship in Sydney playing in the second tier tournament going through undefeated to win the Trophy defeating the Philippines 14–10 in the final.

Current squad
Squad selected for the 2018 Emerging Nations World Championship;

All-time results record
Below is table of the official representative rugby league matches played by Poland at test level up until 13 October 2018.

References

Match reports

 
Rugby league
Poland